Beacon station is a commuter rail stop on the Metro-North Railroad's Hudson Line, serving Beacon, New York. The station is heavily used by residents of Orange and Dutchess Counties who drive to the station.

It is a wheelchair accessible station, featuring wheelchair ramps, an elevator to the train platform, and a high-level island platform which is level with the doors on the train (for many years, most Upper Hudson Line stations had platforms that were lower than the train doors). It also boasts a small newsstand on the platform itself, open daily. It is not fully ADA accessible.

Paid parking is provided. There are spaces that require permits and others which can be paid for on a daily basis. Parking is free on weekends and holidays.

 renovations by the Metropolitan Transportation Authority reflect the station's increasing traffic and importance as a destination. The Dia Beacon art museum, a short walk from the station, has drawn regular visitors from the city since its 2003 opening to see its collection of large installations which could not be shown in the more limited spaces available in Manhattan. Many signs in and around the station point the way. The heavy Dia traffic on weekends is complemented by visitors to prisoners at Fishkill or Downstate correctional facilities, who take many of the taxis available from the station to the prisons just outside town.

The station complex also has long housed an upper Hudson Line station of the MTA Police.

History
Rail service in Beacon can be traced as far back as December 6, 1849, with the Hudson River Railroad. The station was originally named "Fishkill Landing," and like many others on the Hudson Line, it is also right on the Hudson River. On September 4, 1866, the Dutchess and Columbia Railroad was established with the hope of running from the south side of Fishkill Creek northeast and north to meet the New York and Harlem Railroad at Craryville, New York. This junction and the station were built south of Fishkill Landing, and would be known forever as Dutchess Junction. The first station at Dutchess Junction, which was shared by the NYC&HR and D&C was burned down in April 1876, and rebuilt. The railroad along the river was acquired by the New York Central and Hudson River Railroad in November 1869. By 1877, the D&C was taken over by the Newburgh, Dutchess and Connecticut Railroad. In 1881 the New York and New England Railroad built a ferry port near Fishkill Landing station, and added a connecting spur along the north side of the Fishkill Creek (now known as the Beacon Secondary) leading to what became Wickopee Junction, and turned it over to the ND&C.

Dutchess Junction station would face another fire in 1893, and was replaced by little more than a sheltered shed which lasted only into the 1950s. The New York and New England ferry terminal was bought by the New York, New Haven and Hartford Railroad, along with the rest of the NY&NE in 1898. In 1905 the New York, New Haven and Hartford Railroad acquired the ND&C, and in 1907 merged it into the Central New England Railway, which itself was acquired by the New Haven Railroad system in 1904, and allowed to operate under its own name until 1927. In the meantime the NYC&HR became the New York Central Railroad System in 1914.

Between 1913 and 1915, the original HRR line was realigned, and the station was rebuilt in order to accommodate both the New York Central Railroad Hudson Division, as well as the connecting spur of the ND&C along the north side of Fishkill Creek. Since Fishkill Landing was consolidated into the City of Beacon in 1913, the new station would be called Beacon as well. Additionally, the station also contained a new ferry dock designed for trains, passengers, and eventually cars. By 1916, the ND&C was moved from the southeast side of Fishkill Creek to the north side of the creek, and the original section between Dutchess Junction and Wickopee Junction was gradually abandoned in the 1930s. The New Haven Railroad continued to gradually reduce service along the ND&C, although they never completely eliminated service. In 1930 the ferry route officially became part of New York State Route 52.

The decline in railroad service during the post-WW II era affected Beacon station as it did with much of the country, but other forces also put the station at risk. Winter freezes along the Hudson (including one that stranded a ferry boat in the Hudson River), and the construction of the Newburgh–Beacon Bridge brought ferry service at the station to an end. New York Central merged with their long time rival Pennsylvania Railroad in 1968 to form Penn Central Railroad, then acquired the New York, New Haven and Hartford Railroad in 1969, including the former ND&C. Amtrak took over intercity passenger service in 1971, but Beacon station continued to serve only Penn Central Hudson Line commuter trains which by that time ran to Poughkeepsie and was subsidized by the MTA beginning in 1972. A fire in 1976 destroyed the station built by New York Central in 1913, which was demolished later that year to create more parking capacity. Conrail took over Penn Central in 1976 continued to operate Hudson Line trains until Metro-North Commuter Railroad assumed operation in 1983.

On October 17, 2005, ferry service to the station from Newburgh resumed after 42 years in which the Newburgh–Beacon Bridge had sufficed to bring people across the river. This has allowed the MTA to essentially increase the available parking for the station with little new construction due to the availability of land on the Newburgh waterfront. Fare is $1.75 per person each way; unlike Beacon, parking in Newburgh is free. Those purchasing monthly train passes also have the option to include the Newburgh-Beacon ferry in their ticket. Rail and ferry service at Beacon was severely disrupted by Hurricane Irene in 2011 and Hurricane Sandy in 2012, but not obliterated.

Station layout
The station has one six-car-long high-level island platform.

References

External links 

Beacon Station History (NYC-CNE)

Metro-North Railroad stations in New York (state)
Former New York Central Railroad stations
Stations along Central New England Railway lines
Beacon, New York
Railway stations in Dutchess County, New York